Eddie King (18 September 1911 – 8 June 1994) was a Canadian middle-distance runner. He competed in the men's 800 metres at the 1932 Summer Olympics.

References

1911 births
1994 deaths
Athletes (track and field) at the 1932 Summer Olympics
Canadian male middle-distance runners
Olympic track and field athletes of Canada
Sportspeople from Alberta
People from Flagstaff County